Schistopterum ismayi is a species of tephritid or fruit flies in the genus Schistopterum of the family Tephritidae.

Distribution
New Guinea.

References

Tephritinae
Insects described in 1982
Diptera of Asia